William Watts Parmley (born January 22, 1936) was a general authority of the Church of Jesus Christ of Latter-day Saints (LDS Church) from 2003 to 2009.  Prior to becoming a general authority, Parmley had served as the chief of cardiology at the University of California, San Francisco and did studies primarily relating to cardiovascular pharmacology.

Early life and education
Parmley was born in Salt Lake City, Utah, to Thomas J. Parmley and his wife, LaVern W. Parmley.  From 1957 to 1958 he served as an LDS missionary in the Northwestern States Mission based in Portland, Oregon.  Parmley received a bachelor's degree in physics from Harvard University, an M.D. from Johns Hopkins Medical School, and internal medicine training from Johns Hopkins Medical School and Peter Bent Brigham Hospital.

Career
Parmley was involved in several studies involving heart muscle issues. He wrote the 1996 text entitled Cardiology. He also served as the editor-in-chief of the Journal of the American College of Cardiology and as president of the American College of Cardiology. Parmley also co-authored with Stanton Glantz several papers on the health effects of passive smoking that were covered by the news media. He retired from the University of California, San Francisco in 2003, after which he became active in a campaign to eradicate measles.

Parmley became a member of the LDS Church's Second Quorum of the Seventy in April 2003. Prior to his call as a general authority, Parmley served previously in the church as a bishop, stake president, and area seventy. 
As a general authority, Parmley served in the presidency of the church's Africa Southeast Area.

From 2009 to 2012, Parmley was president of the Sacramento California Temple.

Personal life
Parmley is married to Shanna Lee Nielsen and they are the parents of four children.

Notes

References
“Elder William W. Parmley Of the Seventy,” Liahona, May 2003, p. 127
2008 Deseret News Church Almanac (Salt Lake City, Utah: Deseret News, 2007) p. 57.
Church News, May 17, 2003

External links
Grampa Bill's G.A. Pages: William W. Parmley

1936 births
20th-century Mormon missionaries
American general authorities (LDS Church)
American Mormon missionaries in the United States
American cardiologists
Area seventies (LDS Church)
Harvard University alumni
Johns Hopkins School of Medicine alumni
Living people
Members of the Second Quorum of the Seventy (LDS Church)
University of California, San Francisco faculty
Temple presidents and matrons (LDS Church)
Medical journal editors
Latter Day Saints from California
Latter Day Saints from Maryland
Latter Day Saints from Massachusetts
Latter Day Saints from Utah